Laroo may refer to:

Laroo T.H.H., American rapper
Saskia Laroo (born 1959), Dutch jazz musician